John Lees-Jones (25 September 1887 – 13 January 1966) was a British Conservative Party politician.

He was first elected to Parliament October 27, at the 1931 general election as Member of Parliament (MP) for the Manchester Blackley constituency, and he was re-elected at the 1935 election.  At the 1945 general election, he was defeated  by Labour's John Diamond and left office on the June 15

References 
 

UK Parliament page

1887 births
1966 deaths
Conservative Party (UK) MPs for English constituencies
UK MPs 1931–1935
UK MPs 1935–1945
Place of birth missing
Place of death missing
Politicians from Manchester